Turn Off the Moon is a 1937 American comedy film directed by Lewis Seiler, written by Mildred Harrington, Marguerite Roberts, Paul Gerard Smith and Harlan Ware, and starring Charlie Ruggles, Eleanore Whitney, Johnny Downs, Kenny Baker, Phil Harris and Ben Blue. It was released on May 14, 1937, by Paramount Pictures. It was directed by George Archenbaud and Produced by Fanchon.

Plot

Star-gazing department store owner J. Elliott Dinwiddy believes everything an astrologist, Dr. Wakefield, tells him. So when he supposedly can win the heart of secretary Myrtle Tweep just by arranging a love match between a boy and girl by a certain hour that night, while the stars are in alignment, Dinwiddy is determined to do just that.

He singles out Caroline Wilson, a dancer who happened to be in the store. Dinwiddy plays cupid to pair her with Terry Keith, a popular songwriter who has been giving musical help to Dinwiddy's no-talent son. A few mixups later, Caroline gets arrested, Dinwiddy does, too, and when Myrtle gets a call, she's no help at all. Wakefield extends the deadline, giving time for Dinwiddy to get the couples in question back together.

Cast 
Charlie Ruggles as J. Elliott Dinwiddy
Eleanore Whitney as Caroline Wilson
Johnny Downs as Terry Keith
Kenny Baker as himself
Phil Harris as himself
Ben Blue as Luke
Marjorie Gateson as Myrtle Tweep
Grady Sutton as Truelove Spencer
Romo Vincent as Detective Dugan
Andrew Tombes as Dr. Wakefield
Constance Bergen as Maizie Jones
Franklin Pangborn as Mr. Perkins
The Albee Sisters as themselves
The Fanchonettes as themselves
Floyd Christy as Specialty Act
Hal Gould as Specialty Act
Pat West as Photographer
Charles Williams as Brooks
Jean Lorraine as Cigarette Girl
Eddie Foy, Jr. as Dancer
Don Ackerman as Dancer

References

External links 
 

1937 films
Paramount Pictures films
American comedy films
1937 comedy films
Films directed by Lewis Seiler
American black-and-white films
1930s English-language films
1930s American films